Rita Allene Quigley (March 31, 1923 – August 25, 2008) was an American actress who later became Corporate Secretary, and the first woman on the board of directors, of the Petroleum Club of Los Angeles.  She was the elder sister of Juanita Quigley, who was also an actress, beginning in films at the age of three in 1934.

Career 
A visit to the commissary of Universal Pictures in 1939 led to Quigley's film career. She was seen by producer Joe Pasternak as she ate lunch with her mother and her sister, and that contact resulted in a role for her in the Deanna Durbin film First Love.

Quigley made her film debut in 1940 in Susan and God, and appeared in more than a dozen other movies, including Five Little Peppers in Trouble, The Howards of Virginia, Whispering Footsteps and The Human Comedy.

Personal life
Quigley was born in Bell, California and was married to Arthur Goehner. She left acting in the late 1940s to focus on raising her family.

Death
Quigley died in Arroyo Grande, California. She is buried in Calvary Cemetery in Los Angeles.

Filmography

References

External links

1923 births
2008 deaths
American film actresses
Actresses from Los Angeles
People from Bell, California
20th-century American actresses
21st-century American women